Deborah Falconer is an American singer, songwriter, model, and actress. Her first album was Untangle. She released her second album, Brave Like Me, on July 22, 2003. Her third album, Lift Your Gaze, was released on October 18, 2014.

Personal life
Falconer married Robert Downey Jr. on May 29, 1992, after dating for 42 days. The couple divorced on April 26, 2004. They have one son together, Indio.

Filmography

Film

Television

References

External links

Living people
American film actresses
American women singers
20th-century American actresses
Musicians from Sacramento, California
Actresses from Sacramento, California
Singers from California
Year of birth missing (living people)
21st-century American women